Yesiplevo is a rural locality (a selo) and the administrative center of Yesiplevskoye Rural Settlement, Kolchuginsky District, Vladimir Oblast, Russia. The population was 458 in 2010. There are 14 streets.

Geography 
Yesiplevo is located on the Ilmovka River, 15 km east of Kolchugino (the district's administrative centre) by road. Sloboda is the nearest rural locality.

References 

Rural localities in Kolchuginsky District